Pseudomyrmex triplarinus is a venomous species of ant that lives in symbiosis with trees of the genus Triplaris, including the South American species T. americana, T. cumingiama, and T. felipensis. The ant protects the trees against predation by other insects and animals. The ant's venom has anti-inflammatory properties.

References

Pseudomyrmecinae
Insects described in 1850